Lohi may refer to:

Lohi, Pakistan, a town in Balochistan, Pakistan
Lohi sheep, a sheep breed

People with the surname
Eero Lohi (born 1927), Finnish modern pentathlete
Markus Lohi, Finnish politician

Finnish-language surnames